Peter J. Schmitt (June 27, 1950 – October 3, 2012), R-Massapequa, was the leader of Nassau County, New York's Legislature. Schmitt represented the 12th legislative district in Nassau County, which includes Massapequa, Massapequa Park, most of North Massapequa, and part of Seaford. A graduate of Hofstra University, he had lived in the area since 1974.

He was elected to the Legislature in 1995 when it was first created and has represented the 12th district ever since Schmitt served as the Legislature's Deputy Presiding Officer from 1996 to 1999 when it was under Republican control. From 2000 to 2009, he served as Minority Leader, and he served as Presiding Officer from 2010 to his death in 2012, after Republicans regained control of the Legislature.

Death
Schmitt died suddenly on October 3, 2012, aged 62, of a heart attack during a conference with County Executive Ed Mangano. He was 62 years old.

References

1950 births
2012 deaths
People from Massapequa, New York
New York (state) Republicans
Place of birth missing
Hofstra University alumni